George Child Villiers may refer to:

 George Child Villiers, 5th Earl of Jersey (1773–1859), British Conservative politician, Lord Chamberlain of the Household, Master of the Horse
 George Child Villiers, 6th Earl of Jersey (1808–1859), English peer, Member of Parliament for Rochester, Minehead, Honiton, Weymouth & Melcome Regis, Cirencester
 George Child Villiers, 8th Earl of Jersey (1873–1923), English peer, Lord-in-Waiting
 George Child Villiers, 9th Earl of Jersey (1910–1998), English peer
 George Henry Child Villiers, Viscount Villiers (1948–1998), son of the 9th Earl of Jersey
 William Villiers, 10th Earl of Jersey (born George Francis William Child Villiers, 1976), British actor, writer, producer

See also
 George Villiers (disambiguation)